This is a list of computer systems that were significantly or completely designed in the former Yugoslavia before the breakup of the country in 1990s. This list does not include imported foreign computers. Some of these were assembled as per original manufacturer's license. See history of computer hardware in Yugoslavia for more information.

See also
 History of computer hardware in Yugoslavia

References

Computer systems
Computing-related lists
Socialist Federal Republic of Yugoslavia
Yugoslavia-related lists
Science and technology in Yugoslavia
History of computing